X53 may refer to:
Boeing X-53 Active Aeroelastic Wing
X53 Stirling–Kinross, a withdrawn bus route
X53, a Jurassic Coaster route between Weymouth and Axminster